The Wyoming United States House election for 1898 was held on November 8, 1898. Former Republican representative Frank Wheeler Mondell defeated Democratic Constantine P. Arnold with 54.71% of the vote, making Mondell the first former representative to regain his seat in Wyoming and the first to hold the office for two terms.

Results

References

1898
Wyoming
1898 Wyoming elections